Aimée Joaristi (born 1957) is a multidisciplinary Cuban artist. Her works include painting, installation, video art, photography and performance.

She has participated in individual and collective exhibitions, and works are situated in both public and private collections in Cuba, Chile, Latvia, Spain, Costa Rica, France, Mexico and the United States.

Biography 
Joaristi was born in Havana, Cuba, and lived there with her family until the beginning of the Cuban Revolution of 1959. In response to simmering civil unrest, her family moved to Miami and, when Joaristi was three years old. The family would later retreat into exile to Madrid, Spain, the home of her paternal grandparents and maternal great-grandparents. While living in Madrid, Joaristi visited museums and galleries in the city with her uncle, in addition to learning about various cultures, towns and buildings while travelling with her parents in Europe. She took an early interest in the work of Salvador Dalí, which would later come to influence the surrealist nature of her work. At the age of 17, she began her studies in interior architecture in Madrid and at the age of 20, began the study of graphic design at the Fashion Institute of Technology in New York City.

She worked in Milan in the fashion world of Prêt-à-porter and as an interior designer, which years later motivated her to open an architecture and interior design studio in Costa Rica.

In 2008 she decided to focus completely on her art.

Awards and recognition 

She won the International Emerging Artist Award (IEAA) in 2016 and Contemporary Art Curator Magazine's Artist of the Future Award in 2020.

She was selected for the following collections: Art and Fashion, Britain, “La Fiesta del Laberinto” for textile design (2013); seven consecutive times for Pop and Op Surrealism collection at the Saatchi Gallery (2013); and foulards by Ostinelli Seta (2014).

Among her commissioned work is "The End of the Beginning" (2015, Saatchi Gallery).

Current work 
In her artistic practice, many of Joaristi's works tend to be developed in parallel, so many of her projects are continuous processes. As an example of this, since 2020 she has been developing a work called “Cayados”, made up of 13 canes sculpted in ceramics and a video art that establishes a game of relationship between fragility and strength. This was born after an accident that she had at the beginning of 2020 where her spine was affected, seeking to symbolize certain emotions and some very significant events that she went through in her life during that same year. 

She has permanent collections at Museo de Artes Decorativas y Diseño (Latvia), Arte Al Límite (Chile), Kendall Art Center (United States), Museo Wifredo Lam (Cuba), Museo La Neomudéjar (Spain), and Museo Zapadores (Spain).

Featured art projects

Tres cruces (2018) 
This work recounts a tragic event that occurred in Costa Rica on April 6, 1986, when seven women were raped and murdered after participating in a pilgrimage activity in La Cruz de Alajuelita. The crime of case of La Cruz de Alajuelita has not been clarified to date nor has anyone linked to the crimes been publicly prosecuted. For this work, Joaristi reflects on the connection between the languages ​​of her previous work and where abstraction and landscape guide the viewer through the geography of the event.…The place was very close to me both because of its location in the Cerros de San Miguel of Escazú where I live, and because it is the destination for morning walks where I start my day. Without further ado, and in search of images (...) to articulate this project, I threw myself voraciously on the mountain, armed with a camera, a cane, and water. I went up without thinking about the effort. I only thought about the meaning I should give to this fact and how to "appropriate" a tragic moment, ruled by the pain of others, to translate that experience through the language of art.Tres Cruces, is a video installation complemented with painting and photography, mixing traditional art and technology; it is made up of three scenes or spaces that seek to show the gender violence that surrounded this event. In addition, it is accompanied by a video art that shows the crime zone from a more real and current view, but with the purpose of remembering the suffering that the victims went through.

This work was exhibited at the Museo C.A.V. La Neo-Mudejar in Madrid.

Manifiesto Púb(l)ico (2019) 
This work is grounded in the struggle to eradicate inequality and machismo from society, seeking a reconstruction of women outside of socially patriarchal prejudices and stigmas that have limited them on many levels. Public Manifesto  is a work of space appropriation in which the artist seeks to desexualize and naturalize women from the normality of the genitals without resorting to a reproduction attached to reality, but by making an explicit social reference. This work has been exhibited in various spaces around the world and has caused various reactions according to the culture and normalization of sexuality in countries such as Cuba, Japan, Spain, Italy, Costa Rica, the United States and South Africa.

Books
Joaristi's published works include:

 Silencios y gritos (2015)
 The Best of 2016: International Emerging Artists (2016)
 Entre Siglos: Arte Contemporáneo de Centroamérica y Panamá (2016)
 Arte Al Límite (2017)
 The First Berliner Art Book (2017)
 Important World Artists (2017)
 Lenguaje Sucio (2019)

References

External links 
Aimée Joaristi official website
Aimée Joaristi in Arteinformado
Aimée Joaristi in the Costa Rica cultural directory

1957 births
Living people
People from San José, Costa Rica
Costa Rican women artists
21st-century Costa Rican painters
Costa Rican painters
Artists from Havana
21st-century women artists
21st-century painters
Costa Rican installation artists
Cuban emigrants to Costa Rica
Costa Rican women painters